CHINAH is a three-member, English-language band from Copenhagen, Denmark. The group has backgrounds in folk, contemporary classical, and electronica music. Its members are singer and songwriter Fine Glindvad Jensen, guitarist Simon Kjær Lauridsen and electronic musician and pianist Simon Lars Gustav Andersson. CHINAH released their debut single "Away from Me" in July 2015.

History
The group was founded in 2014 under the band name "Fine Glindvad" and included singer and songwriter Fine Glindvad, guitarist Simon Kjær and electronic musician and pianist Simon Andersson. Their music had a strong folk influence, with a focus on poetry and melody. The group later moved into an electronic, song focused style containing minimalist beats, synthesizers and guitar passages.

In May 2015, the group emerged as "CHINAH" and debuted at the SPOT Festival - a festival showcasing up-and-coming Danish and Nordic music. There, the group's "contemplative gourmet pop" music style was described as "organic guitar, hard-hitting synths, and wistful vocals". On 7 July 2015, CHINAH released their debut single, "Away from Me". The song, which was written in early Spring 2014, was the first release from their debut 5-track EP. On 27 August 2015, CHINAH released "We Go Back", their second single from their debut EP.

In February 2016 they released the EP Once The Lights Are On. In January 2017 they released the single "Even Love" from their next EP Hints.

In November 2018, CHINAH released their debut album ANYONE, following the release of three singles from the album, Real Thing?, Strange Is Better and Yeah Right.

In March 2021, CHINAH released their second album Feels Like Forever, following the release of three singles from the album, Promise, Mysterious, and What I've Become.

Discography

Albums

Extended plays

Singles

References

External links
 
 
CHINAH on SoundCloud

2014 establishments in Denmark
Culture in Copenhagen
Electropop groups
Danish musical groups
Danish pop music groups
Danish electronic music groups
Musical groups established in 2014
Danish musical trios